The following lists events that happened during 2016 in the Grand Duchy of Luxembourg.

Incumbents
Monarch: Henri
Prime Minister: Xavier Bettel

Events
5–21 August - 10 athletes from Luxembourg competed in the 2016 Summer Olympics in Rio de Janeiro, Brazil

References

 
2010s in Luxembourg
Years of the 21st century in Luxembourg
Luxembourg
Luxembourg